The Loushui River is the main tributary of the Lishui River in China. It starts in the southwestern part Hubei Province (Wufeng and Hefeng counties), and flows into Hunan Province.

Right before leaving Hubei for Hunan, the river is interrupted by the Jiangpinghe Dam.

References

Rivers of Hubei